Shorey House may refer to:

in the United States

 Shorey House, a student residential "house", in International House, part of the Housing at the University of Chicago, in Illinois
 Charles Shorey House, Hillsboro, Oregon, listed on the National Register of Historic Places